Infinite Worlds may refer to:

Infinite Worlds (book), 2005 nonfiction book
GURPS Infinite Worlds, 2005 role playing game
Infinite Worlds, 2007 album by Vagabon
The Infinite Worlds of H. G. Wells, 2001 television miniseries
 Infinite Worlds (album)